The Diocese of Rockhampton is a Latin Church ecclesiastical territory or diocese of the Catholic Church in Australia. It is a suffragan in the ecclesiastical province of the metropolitan Archdiocese of Brisbane. Erected in 1882, it covers Central Queensland.

History
The Diocese of Rockhampton was excised from the Archdiocese of Brisbane on 29 December 1882. Prior to this, the Brisbane archdiocese had responsibility for the entire state of Queensland, but the creation of the Rockhampton diocese split the state with responsibilities for the southern part of Queensland to remain with the Brisbane archdiocese while the northern part of Queensland became the responsibility of the new Rockhampton diocese. The Diocese of Townsville was excised from the Diocese of Rockhampton in 1930, reducing Rockampton's coverage to Central Queensland, while Townsville took responsibility for the areas further to the north.

Bishops

Ordinaries
The following individuals have been elected as Roman Catholic Bishops of Rockhampton:
{| class="wikitable sortable"
!Order !!Name !!Date enthroned !!Reign ended !!Term of office !!Reason for term end
|-
|align="center"| || John Cani †||align="center"| 3 January 1882 ||align="center"| 3 March 1898 ||align="right"|  || Died in office
|-
|align="center"| || Joseph Higgins †||align="center"| 21 September 1899 ||align="center"| 3 March 1905 ||align="right"|  || Appointed Bishop of Ballarat
|-
|align="center"| || James Duhig †||align="center"| 16 September 1905 ||align="center"| 27 February 1912 ||align="right"|  || Elevated as Coadjutor Archbishop of Brisbane
|-
|align="center"| || Joseph Shiel †||align="center"| 11 May 1913 || align="center" | 7 April 1931 ||align="right"|  || Died in office
|-
|align="center"| || Romuald Denis Hayes, SSC †||align="center"| 12 January 1932 ||align="center"| 25 October 1945 ||align="right"|  || Died in office
|-
|align="center"| || Andrew Gerard Tynan †||align="center"| 31 March 1946 ||align="center"| 3 June 1960 ||align="right"|  || Died in office
|-
|align="center"| || Francis Roberts Rush †||align="center"| 7 November 1960 ||align="center"| 5 March 1973 ||align="right"|  || Elevated as Archbishop of Brisbane
|-
|align="center"| || Bernard Joseph Wallace † ||align="center"| 24 January 1974 ||align="center"| 8 May 1990 ||align="right"|  || Resigned and appointed Bishop Emeritus of Rockhampton
|-
|align="center"| || Brian Heenan ||align="center"| 20 November 1992 ||align="center"| 1 October 2013 ||align="right"|  || Retired and appointment Bishop Emeritus of Rockhampton 
|-
|align="center"| ||Michael McCarthy ||align="center"| 29 May 2014 ||align="center"| present ||align="right"|  || n/a
|-
|}

Other priests of this diocese who became bishops
Guilford Clyde Young †, appointed Auxiliary Bishop of Canberra (and Goulburn) in 1948
Raymond Conway Benjamin †, appointed Bishop of Townsville in 1984

Cathedral

Parishes
The diocese is divided into four separate deaneries that administer individual parishes:

Central deanery covering Rockhampton and the Capricorn Coast with regular liturgical services held in the Cathedral of St Joseph, Emu Park (Mary Immaculate), Gracemere (St Paul), Mount Morgan (Sacred Heart), Berserker (St Mary), Norman Gardens (Holy Family), Park Avenue (Our Lady Help of Christians), Westwood (Sacred Heart), Wowan (St Anne), and Yeppoon (Sacred Heart)
Southern deanery covering Bundaberg, Gladstone and the Valleys Region with regular liturgical services held in Agnes Water (St Agnes), Baffle Creek (St Francis of Assis), Baralaba (St Patrick), Bargara (St James), Biloela (St Joseph), Bundaberg (Holy Rosary), Calliope (St Patrick), Gladstone (Our Lady, Star of the Sea), Miriam Vale (St Peter Chanel), Mount Larcom (Our Lady of Mt Carmel), Monto (St Therese), Moura (St Michael), Walkervale (St Mary), Tannum Sands (St Peter Chanel), Theodore (Sacred Heart), Ubobo (St Mary), Bundaberg West (St Patrick)
Northern deanery with regular liturgical services held in Alligator Creek (St Therese), Bucasia (St Brendan), Calen (St Helen), Eton (Holy Cross), Farleigh (St Brigid), Finch Hatton (St Francis de Sales), Mackay (St Patrick), Marian (Holy Rosary), Midge Point (St Peter), Mirani (Immaculate Conception), North Mackay (St Joseph), Sarina (St Michael), Seaforth (Star of the Sea), South Mackay (St Mary), Walkerston (St John the Apostle), and West Mackay (St Francis Xavier)
Western deanery covering two regions with regular liturgical services held in:
Central Highlands region – Blackwater (Mary Immaculate), Capella (St Joseph), Clermont (St Mary), Dingo (St Joseph), Duaringa (St Kevin), Dysart (St Therese of Lisieux), Emerald (St Patrick), Middlemount (Holy Family), Moranbah (St Joseph the Worker), Springsure (Our Lady of the Sacred Heart), Tieri (St Thomas More), and Woorabinda (St Martin de Porres)
Central West region – Alpha (St John the Evangelist), Aramac (St John), Barcaldine (Sacred Heart), Blackall (St Patrick), Ilfracombe (Sacred Heart), Isisford (St Joseph), Jericho (St Finnian), Jundah (St Peter), Longreach (St Brigid) and Tambo (Our Lady of Victories)

Education 
The diocese operates many Catholic schools via its Rockhampton Catholic Education Office.

See also 

Roman Catholicism in Australia

References

External links
Catholic Diocese of Rockhampton

 
Rockhampton
Rockhampton, Roman Catholic Diocese of
Rockhampton Region
Rockhampton
Rockhampton
Rockhampton
Buildings and structures in Central Queensland